Chardente Saya Ndoulou (also spelt Saya-Ndoulou, born 15 August 1990) is a Congolese women's footballer who played as a forward.

Personal life
Saya Ndoulou is from Zanaga, Republic of the Congo. Saya Ndoulou is the sister of Congelese footballer Laure Koléla. In 2008, Saya Ndoulou and Koléla fled Congo due to the war there, and claimed asylum in France.

Club career

In the 2011–12 season, Saya Ndoulou scored 22 goals for Division 2 Féminine side , making her the division's top scorer. She scored six goals in eight appearances for Compiègne in the 2012–13 season. During the season, she transferred to Division 1 Féminine side FCF Arras. Arras lost 1–4 in the first match that Saya Ndoulou played for them. Saya Ndoulou scored two goals in nine appearances during the 2012–13 Division 1 Féminine.

International career
She has been co-captain of the Congo women's national football team, alongside Laure Koléla. She scored for Congo in a 2004 African Women's Championship qualification match against Equatorial Guinea.

References

External links

1990 births
Living people
Republic of the Congo women's international footballers
Women's association football forwards
Republic of the Congo women's footballers
Republic of the Congo expatriate sportspeople in France
People from Lékoumou Department